were officials of the Tokugawa shogunate with responsibilities as an official representatives of the shogunate in Ise.

Conventional interpretations have construed these Japanese titles as "commissioner", "overseer" or "governor".

List of Yamada bugyō

 Inoue Shūen.
 Inoue Hachirōbei, 1609.
 Ōoka Tadasuke, 1717.

See also
 Bugyō

Notes

References
 Beasley, William G. (1955).  Select Documents on Japanese Foreign Policy, 1853–1868. London: Oxford University Press. [reprinted by RoutledgeCurzon, London, 2001.   (cloth)]
 Murdoch, James. (1926). A History of Japan. London: Kegan Paul, Trench, Trubner & Co.  reprinted by Routledge, 1996. 
 Papinot, Edmond. (1972).  Historical and Geographical Dictionary of Japan. Tokyo: Tuttle Publishing.
 Turnbull, Stephen R.  (1988).  The Kakure Kirishitan of Japan: A Study of Their Development, Beliefs and Rituals to the Present Day.  London: Routledge. 

Government of feudal Japan
Officials of the Tokugawa shogunate